Točilovo may refer to:

Točilovo (Tutin), Serbia
Točilovo (Prijepolje), in Prijepolje, Serbia